Hosta yingeri is a perennial species of the genus Hosta. The species is rare and is only found in a few offshore islands along the southwestern coast of South Korea.

References

yingeri
Endemic flora of South Korea